Bill Hennessy may refer to:

 Bill Hennessy (Kilkenny hurler) (born 1968)
 Bill Hennessy (Cork hurler) (1882–1954)